Corina del Parral Durán (b. 25 January 1905, Bahía Blanca – d. 8 February 1979, Buenos Aires) was an Argentine writer, poet, pianist, and composer. Married to President José María Velasco Ibarra, she served four terms as the First Lady of Ecuador.

Biography
Corina del Parral Durán was born in Bahía Blanca, Argentina to Ernst Patrick Parral López-Chacón and Corina Eulogia Durán Peña on 25 January 1905. She began basic studies at the French Institute of Jeanne d'Arc and music at the Williams Conservatory, both in Bahía Blanca. She graduated from the latter with high marks, then went to Buenos Aires to continue her music and piano studies. Using her musical education, del Parral composed classical pieces for the piano and orchestra, and Argentine and Ecuadorian folk music. Her Ecuadorian musical folk songs were interpreted by the group Los Brillantes  to raise funds for the Ecuadorian institution she founded herself, while she was the First Lady of Ecuador, to support the poorest childhood in Ecuador. Her music was recorded on acetate discs. Parral's works as a writer have been published by the House of Ecuadorian culture and the Central Bank of Ecuador.

In 1934, Parral and her mother attended a reception for an Ecuadorian plenipotentiary in Buenos Aires, where she met the newly elected President of Ecuador, José María Velasco Ibarra. When he was deposed, del Parral began corresponding with Velasco to encourage him during his exile to Colombia. The couple's epistolary relationship resulted in their marriage in Buenos Aires on 24 August 1938.

First Lady of Ecuador
When José María Velasco Ibarra was elected for the second time in 1944, Parral became First Lady of Ecuador. In this capacity,  she founded the institution that later became the National Institute for Children and the Family, a position that henceforth would be held by all Ecuadorian First Ladies.

Citations

1905 births
1979 deaths
First ladies of Ecuador
20th-century Argentine women writers
20th-century Argentine writers
People from Bahía Blanca
Argentine classical composers
Women classical composers
20th-century Argentine women singers
Argentine women composers